Obscurity may refer to:
 Security through obscurity, a controversial principle in security engineering which attempts to use secrecy to provide security
 Obscurity (band), German melodic metal band

See also 

 Obscurantism
 Obscure (disambiguation)
 Obscurities (disambiguation)